Miss Cape Verde or well-known as "Miss Cabo Verde" is a national Beauty pageant in Cape Verde. The Miss Cabo Verde founded in 1996 and renewed in 2002 by Capital Modell Agency. The main winner is expected to represent the country at the Miss World competition.

Titleholders

Miss Cape Verde

Miss Cabo Verde International

Miss Earth Cape Verde

References

External links
Official website

Cape Verde
Recurring events established in 1996
Cape Verdean awards